James Joseph Murphy (November 3, 1898 – October 19, 1962) was an American businessman, World War I veteran, and politician who served two terms as a United States representative from New York from 1949 to 1953.

Biography
He was born in Brooklyn, and educated in the public schools of Staten Island.

Military service 
Murphy served as a noncommissioned officer with the 1st New York Cavalry on the Mexican border during the Pancho Villa Expedition in 1916. During World War I, he was a sergeant with the 104th Machine Gun Battalion, 27th Division, and served in France and Belgium.

Business 
After the war, Murphy engaged in the import and export shipping business in New York City.

Political career 
In 1948, Murphy was elected as a Democrat to the 81st Congress.  He was reelected in 1950, and served from January 3, 1949 to January 3, 1953. He was an unsuccessful candidate for reelection in 1952.

Murphy served on the New York City Council from 1954 to 1957.

Later career and death 
He was a freight and shipping broker and resided in the Grymes Hill area of Staten Island.

He died on Staten Island in 1962, and was buried at Saint Peter's Cemetery on Staten Island.

References

External links

1898 births
1962 deaths
People from Brooklyn
New York City Council members
Democratic Party members of the United States House of Representatives from New York (state)
20th-century American politicians
People from Grymes Hill, Staten Island
Politicians from Staten Island